King's English may refer to:

Received Pronunciation, a form of English language pronunciation
The King's English, a book on English usage and grammar, first published in 1906
The Reversed Sicilian, a chess opening